The carbonated sierra finch (Porphyrospiza carbonaria), also known as the carbon sierra finch, is a species of bird in the family Thraupidae.

It is endemic to Argentina where its natural habitats are subtropical or tropical dry shrubland and temperate grassland.

References

carbonated sierra finch
Endemic birds of Argentina
carbonated sierra finch
Taxonomy articles created by Polbot
Taxobox binomials not recognized by IUCN